Thanthrige Pathirage Mahinda (born March 22, 1952, as මහින්ද පතිරගේ) [Sinhala]), popularly as Mahinda Pathirage, is an actor in Sri Lankan cinema, stage drama and television. Particularly act in comedy roles, Pathirage is best known for the role Purohitha in television sitcom Raja Sabhawa.

Personal life
Mahinda was born on 22 March 1952 in Anuradhapura. His father was  Thanthiri Pathirage Hendrick Appuhami. He has 10 siblings in the family. He completed education until grade 10 from Walisinghe Harischandra Maha Vidyalaya. Before entering to drama, he continued his father's business as photo framer and painter.

Mahinda is married to Kumudini Gunawardhana and the couple has one daughter, Nipuni Sharada and one son, Nandun Nisanka.

Career
In 1976, he along with many artists in Anuradhapura formed a drama group called Jana Nalu Kela. He first played in the play Aruma Naruma produced by Anuradha Ranjith. He won a merit award for his role in that play. In 1977–79, he worked in Rajarata Sevaya of Sri Lanka Broadcasting Corporation along with his friend Gunadasa Madurasinghe. He took part in a radio play Rasavita produced by Premakeerthi de Alwis.

Mahinda started acting career with 1997 television serial Depethi Dahara directed by Malini Fonseka. In 2000, he acted in popular television comedy Sina Sagaraya telecast by Rupavahini. Then in 2003, he joined with Swarnavahini for the sitcom Raja Sabhawa along with Gunadasa Madurasinghe. The drama gave him enormous popularity, which was later produced into a stage play as well. In 1983, he won the award for the Best Actor in Youth Drama Festival for the role in stage play Paarajika.

His maiden cinema acting came through 2000 film Saroja directed by Somaratne Dissanayake with a minor role. Some of his notable films include Sir Last Chance, Ethumai Methumai, Hero Nero and 64 Mayam. In 2016, Pathirage replaced Vijaya Nandasiri after his demise in the play Aluth Horek One. The first show featuring Pathirage was staged at 3.30 pm and 6.45 pm on September 2 at New Town Hall, Colombo.

Notable theater works

 Ahinsaka Prayoge
 Allai Walge
 Aluth Horek Onee
 Chaggudu Sellam
 Hadannama Be
 Heen Andare
 Kaliyuga Kolam
 Korale Mahaththaya
 Paarajika
 Raigamayai Gampalayai
 Raja Sabawa
 Sakra Bhavana

Notable television works

 Bhootha Wasthuwa
 Depethi Dahara 
 Diyathaka Senehasa
 Gem
 Hathara Waram
 Kande Handiya 
 Korale Mahaththaya
 Night Learners
 Paan Batta
 Raja Sabhawa
 Sakala Guru
 Sakala Guru 2
 Sina Sagaraya
 Somibara Jaramara
 Synthetic Sihina
 Tikiri and Ungi

Filmography

References

External links
 Goda Perakadoruwa - Mahinda Pathirage and Gunadasa Madurasinghe
 අප නොදුටු මහින්ද පතිරගේ
 මහින්ද පතිරගේ අල්ලයි වල්ගේ සමඟ 06දා මහනුවර
 එදා කෝච්චි­යෙන් කොළඹ ආව මම අදත් එන්නේ කෝච්චි­යෙන්
 විජේවීරට තෙලිතුඩින් පණදුන් සිත්තරා
 සමකාලීන සිංහල හසරංග කලාවේ අර්බුදය

Sri Lankan male film actors
Sinhalese male actors
Living people
1952 births